Mohamed Adel Mohamed Emam (born 16 September 1984) is an Egyptian actor. He comes from an artistic family as his father is actor Adel Emam. His brother is the director Ramy Imam.

Career
Mohamed went to Jesuites (CSF) school before he entered The American University in Cairo. He studied theater, and acted many roles in the university. One of them was Atawa in El Maghmati's play for the director Mahmoud El Lozy.

Imam played his first role out of the university when he took part in the Egyptian series Kanaria and Shorkah as Ashraf Sayed El Ousy (Hany Awaad Abd El Mohsen). The Egyptian director Marwan Hammed selected him to play the role of Taha in The Yacoubian Building (2006), based on the novel of the same name.

Hassan and Marcus (2008) was his next major film.   The theme of the movie is the tension between Muslims and Christians. This film features Adel Imam, Omar Sharif, Lebleba, and Hanna El Shorbagy. Imam played two characters, the Christian man Girgis Boulus and Emad Hassan, the son of El Sheikh Hassan. Hassan and Marcus was screened at the London Film Festival October 18, 2008 to a full house. Imam won a prize from the Alexandria International Film Festival in 2008 for his work in the film.

In 2012, he starred as Ibrahim in Ferqit Naji Attalah also with Adel Emam. He also starred as Seif in Saheb Elsa3ada in the summer of 2014. He starred with Adel Emam, Lebleba, Edward, Amina Khalil, Tara Emad, Khaled Zaki, Angy Wegdan and Lotfy Labib. That summer he was also in Dalaa3 banat with Mai Ezz Eldin. He also had the starring roles in both films and his first movie "captin Egypt"  and "hell in India" in 2018 Lelyt Hana w Sror

References

External links 
 

Egyptian male film actors
Living people
21st-century Egyptian male actors
1984 births